Mighty to Save may refer to:

 Mighty to Save (Hillsong album), 2006
"Mighty to Save" (song), title song from above same-titled Hillsong album
 Mighty to Save (Neal Morse album), 2010